The Khatyrka is a river in Chukotka Autonomous Okrug, Russia.

The name of the river comes from the Chukot "vatyrkan" (Ватыркан), meaning "dry, depleted place".

Course
The Khatyrka has its source in the Koryak Highlands. It first flows in an ENE direction along the northern slopes of the Komeutyuyam Range as a mountain river within a narrow valley. It bends to the SSE at the northeastern end of the range and the valley expands, the river dividing into channels. In its lower course it flows along a marshy floodplain. A stretch of the river forms the border with the Olyutorsky District of Kamchatka Krai. Its mouth is in an estuary that is separated by a narrow landspit from the Bering Sea. Khatyrka village lies at the mouth of the estuary.

Tributaries

A unique-type of meteorite fell in the area of the Iomrautvaam river basin and was buried in a 7,000-year-old layer of dirt. It was found during an expedition to Chukotka in the summer of 2011.

Flora and fauna
The river basin is characterized by tundra vegetation, including mosses, lichens, dwarf shrubs, and sedges.

The inhabitants of the area are engaged in reindeer herding. River Khatyrka is a good place for fishing. Among the fish species found in the waters of the river the pink salmon, chum salmon, sockeye salmon and Chinook salmon deserve mention.

See also
Khatyrkite
List of rivers of Russia

References

External links
Astronomy.com - An old meteor yields a new surprise: a never-before-seen material
Collisions in outer space produced an icosahedral phase in the Khatyrka meteorite never observed previously in the laboratory
Khatyrka meteorite found to have third quasicrystal
The Penzhina-West Kamchatka folded zone and the Ukelayat-Sredinnyi block in the structure of the Koryak Highland and Kamchatka

Rivers of Chukotka Autonomous Okrug
Koryak Mountains